Pat Cash and Mark Philippoussis won the title, defeating Michael Chang and Todd Martin in the final, 6–2, 6–1.

Draw

Bracket

External links 
 Main draw

Men's Champions Invatiational